Platysaurus torquatus, the striped flat lizard or collared flat lizard, is a species of lizard in the Cordylidae family found in southeast Africa.

Description
Platysaurus torquatus is the only lizard in its genus which has adult males with white stripes on its back. Males, females, and juveniles all have black-brown backs with these thick white stripes. Females and juveniles have a blue tail, while adult males have an orange tail, as well as a collar.

Habits
The diet includes beetles, ants, and caterpillars. They lay two eggs in December.

Habitat and distribution
Platysaurus torquatus live in savanna habitats of Zimbabwe, Mozambique, and Malawi, often on flat outcrops near rivers.

See also
 Platysaurus
 Cordylidae

References

External links
More Information

Platysaurus
Reptiles of Malawi
Reptiles of Mozambique
Reptiles of Zimbabwe
Reptiles described in 1879
Taxa named by Wilhelm Peters